

The National Academy of Scuba Educators, also known as NASE Worldwide (closed), is a recreational scuba training organization which was founded in Texas during 1982. In February 2011 NASE re-launched its image and developed new standards and practices. NASE's training program consists of three streams - recreational scuba diving, technical and professional diving in the recreational field (instructors and divemasters). NASE operates in Colombia, Chile, South Korea,  Russia   and the United States of America.  It has a program of resort and dive center recognition with businesses recognised in the following countries - Barbados, Canada, Fiji, Honduras, Malaysia, and the Turks and Caicos Islands.

EUF Certification
NASE Worldwide Inc. obtained CEN certification from the EUF certification body in 2008 and was re-certified in February 2016.

References

External links
 NASE Worldwide homepage

Underwater diving training organizations